Heteragrion brianmayi is a species of damselfly in the family Heteragrionidae. It was described as a new species in 2013 by F. A. A. Lencioni.
The eponym for the species name "brianmayi" is Queen  lead guitarist Brian May.

In the same publication, Lencioni described three more species of damselfly in the genus Heteragrion after three other members of Queen: H. freddiemercuryi (Freddie Mercury), H. rogertaylori (Roger Taylor), and H. johndeaconi (John Deacon).
Naming four new species after members of the band was done to pay tribute to the 40th anniversary of its founding.

See also 
 List of organisms named after famous people (born 1900–1949)

References

Calopterygoidea
Insects described in 2013
Brian May